Francesco Nicastro (born 26 October 1991) is an Italian footballer who plays as a forward for  club Pontedera.

Club career

Calcio Catania
After working his way through the Catania youth system, the young striker began to be called up on occasion to the first team during the 2009–10 Serie A season. The player made his first team debut as a substitute in the Coppa Italia, quarterfinal match versus Roma on 26 January 2010. Nicastro failed to make any first team appearances during the 2010–11 Serie A campaign, however he did play a major role in the club's youth team, with 12 goals. In July 2011, Nicastro was promoted from the youth squad before being loaned to Pisa in the Italian third division on 19 July 2011.

On 31 August 2012, Nicastro, Marco Fiore and Giordano Maccarrone were loaned to Bellaria.

Rimini
On 6 August 2013, Nicastro and Ameth Fall were signed by Rimini. On 20 June 2014 Rimini acquired Nicastro outright.

Juve Stabia
In the 2014–15 season he was signed by Juve Stabia.

Catanzaro
On 27 July 2019 he signed a 3-year contract with Catanzaro.

Padova
On 8 January 2020 he moved to Padova on a 2-year contract.

Pontedera
On 25 August 2022, Nicastro signed a one-year contract with Pontedera.

References

External links
goal.com

1991 births
Living people
Sportspeople from the Province of Caltanissetta
Footballers from Sicily
Italian footballers
Association football forwards
Calcio Padova players
Serie B players
Serie C players
Catania S.S.D. players
Pisa S.C. players
S.S. Milazzo players
A.C. Bellaria Igea Marina players
Rimini F.C. 1912 players
S.S. Juve Stabia players
Delfino Pescara 1936 players
A.C. Perugia Calcio players
Calcio Foggia 1920 players
Ternana Calcio players
U.S. Catanzaro 1929 players
U.S. Città di Pontedera players